Krishna (1 July 1941 – 21 May 2021) was an Indian politician, former speaker of Karnataka Legislative Assembly and member of the Janata Dal (Secular) from the state of Karnataka.
He was born in Kothamaranahally village (Krishnarajpet Taluk, Mandya district). He died on 21 May 2021 in Mysore, Karnataka.

Political life
Rising in politics, he became Member of  K. R. Pet Taluk Board from 1978 to 1983, later becoming General Secretary of Janata Party for Mandya district in 1980 till 1985. He was elected to Karnataka Legislative Assembly in 1985 and became the Minister of Sericulture and Animal Husbandry in 1988 to remain  in the post till 1989. He was re-elected in 1994 from Krishnarajpete on Janata Dal ticket and resigned from the post after becoming the Member of Parliament from Mandya constituency. He was picked as the Speaker of the Karnataka Legislative Assembly after he became victorious as a Janata Dal (Secular) candidate in 2004 elections.

Death
Krishna was suffering from cancer and was being treated in Chennai. He died at his residence in Kuvempunagar in Mysuru. Then Chief Minister of Karnataka B. S. Yediyurappa, his former H. D. Kumaraswamy and many others condoled the death of Krishna.

Positions held
1978–83: Member, Taluk Board, K.R. Pet Taluk, Mandya district
1980–85: General Secretary, Janata Party, Mandya district
1985–89: Member, Karnataka Legislative Assembly
1985–87: Member, House Committee, Karnataka Legislature
1988–89: Cabinet Minister, Department of Sericulture and Animal Husbandry in S. R. Bommai government
1989–94: General-Secretary, Janata Dal, Karnataka
1994–96: Member, Karnataka Legislative Assembly 
1995–96: Member, House Committee on Industries, Karnataka Legislative Assembly
1996–98: Elected to Lok Sabha (Eleventh) from Mandya 
2004–08: Member, Karnataka Legislative Assembly from Krishnarajapete 
2004–08: Speaker of the Karnataka Legislative Assembly

References

External links 
 Karnataka Legislative Assembly

1941 births
2021 deaths
Janata Dal politicians
Janata Dal (Secular) politicians
Janata Party politicians
India MPs 1996–1997
Speakers of the Karnataka Legislative Assembly
Karnataka MLAs 1985–1989
Karnataka MLAs 1994–1999
Karnataka MLAs 2004–2007
People from Mandya district